Cunninghamites elegans is an extinct conifer species in the family Cupressaceae and the genus Cunninghamites.

Cunninghamites is a genus of the European Late Cretaceous flora.

Remains of C. elegans needles have been found in carcasses of the dinosaur Edmontosaurus.

References

External links 
 Cunninghamites elegans collections.si.edu
 The Upper Cretaceous and Eocene floras of South Carolina and Georgia, Numéros 84 à 85, Edward Wilber Berry, Govt. Print Office, 1914

Cupressaceae
Plants described in 1847
Fossil taxa described in 1847
Late Cretaceous plants